Havfruen Peak is a peak in the eastern part of Bristol Island, South Sandwich Islands. It was named by the UK Antarctic Place-Names Committee in 1971 after the Norwegian barque Havfruen which was damaged by ice and sank off the South Sandwich Islands on December 1, 1911.

References

Mountains and hills of South Georgia and the South Sandwich Islands